Kate Donahoo is a former Olympic level judo for the United States.

References

Olympic judoka of the United States
Judoka at the 1992 Summer Olympics
American female judoka
Living people
Goodwill Games medalists in judo
Year of birth missing (living people)
Pan American Games medalists in judo
Pan American Games gold medalists for the United States
Judoka at the 1991 Pan American Games
Competitors at the 1990 Goodwill Games
20th-century American women